Opisthocheiridae is a family of millipedes belonging to the order Chordeumatida. These millipedes range from 5 mm to 16 mm in length and are found from Belgium to Morocco. Adult millipedes in this family have 26 or 30 segments (counting the collum as the first segment and the telson as the last). This family includes the cave-dwelling species Opisthocheiron canayerensis, notable as one of few chordeumatidan species with only 26 segments. The adult female of this species has only 42 pairs of legs, and the adult male has only 40 leg pairs, as one would expect for adult chordeumatidans with four fewer segments than typically found in this order.

Genera:
 Brachytropisoma Silvestri, 1898
 Ceratosphys Ribaut, 1920
 Fuentea Brölemann, 1920
 Haplosphys Ribaut, 1920
 Hispaniodesmus Verhoeff, 1910
 Hispaniosoma Ribaut, 1913
 Marquetia Ribaut, 1905
 Marquetiella Jeekel, 1969
 Opisthocheiron Ribaut, 1913
 Proceratosphys Mauriès & Vicente, 1977
 Sireuma Reboleira & Enghoff, 2014

References

Chordeumatida